Parrott may refer to:


People
 Parrott (surname)

Places in the United States
 Parrott, Georgia, a city in the United States
 Parrott, Ohio, an unincorporated community
 Parrott, Virginia, an unincorporated community in Pulaski County, Virginia
 Parrott Hall, New York historical home

Military
 Parrott rifle, a type of artillery used in the American Civil War
 , a United States Navy destroyer which served in World War II
 , a United States Navy minesweeper

See also
 Arendell Parrott Academy, a school in North Carolina
 Parrottsville, Tennessee, a town
 Parrot (disambiguation)